College Medical Center, is a community-based teaching hospital located in Long Beach, California.  It is accredited by the Joint Commission on Accreditation of Healthcare Organizations. It was purchased by Santa Fe Springs-based healthcare management company College Health Enterprises Inc., in October 2013 and renamed College Medical Center. This purchase joined the hospital with College Hospital Cerritos and College Hospital Costa Mesa as affiliates of College Health Enterprises.

Since implementing infection control measures, the hospital has nearly eliminated methicillin resistant strains of staphylococcus (MRSA). Measures include an air ventilation system that uses ultraviolet light to kill germs, more time for maintenance staff to clean rooms, and more frequent hand washing by staff members.

History 
The hospital was founded in 1932 as Pacific Hospital of Long Beach. In October 2013, the hospital was purchased by Santa Fe Springs-based healthcare management company College Health Enterprises Inc. and was renamed "College Medical Center."

The hospital previously operated family medicine and dermatology residencies until 2020, which were accredited by the American Osteopathic Association. With the ACGME and AOA merger of graduate medical education for MD and DO residencies, the hospital ceased the family medicine residency due to accreditation conflicts between the two governing bodies.

Graduate Medical Education
College Medical Center operates a residency program in internal medicine and a traditional rotating internship.

See also
 Long Beach Memorial Medical Center
 Community Medical Center Long Beach
 St. Mary Medical Center (Long Beach)

References

External links
Main website
This hospital in the CA Healthcare Atlas A project by OSHPD

Hospital buildings completed in 1932
Hospitals in Los Angeles County, California
Hospitals established in 1932
Teaching hospitals in California
Buildings and structures in Long Beach, California